RunDown Funk U Up is the second studio album by Nigerian recording artist D'banj. It was released by Mo' Hits Records in 2006. The album was produced by Don Jazzy, and supported by the singles "Why Me", "Do You Like the Koko? (Tongolo Remix)", and "Run Down (Funk U Up)", among others.

Singles
"Do You Like the Koko? (Tongolo Remix)" is a single from this album. It is the successor to the hit single "Tongolo" off the No Long Thing album.
"Run Down [Funk U Up]" is a song from this album.
"Why Me" is the lead single from this album. It won the "Song of the Year" award at the 2007 Hip Hip World Awards. It also won the "Hottest Single of the Year" award at the 2007 Nigeria Entertainment Awards. The music video for "Why Me" won the "Best Special Effects Video" award. It received the "Best African West Video" and "Best Male Video" nominations at the 2007 Channel O Music Video Awards. D'banj won the "Listener's Choice Award" at the 2008 MTV Africa Music Awards for the song.

Track listing
"Do You Like the Koko? (Tongolo Remix)" – 4:03
"Why Me" - 3:53
"Run Down (Funk U Up)" – 4:15
"Loke" – 4:14
"Tono Sibe" – 3:42
"Which Way 2 Go?" – 4:11
"Serve The Lord (Bonus Track)" – 0:20
"Run Down F**K U Up" – 4:13
"Tongolo" – 4:12
"Soco" – 0:14
"All the Way" – 3:45
"Mr Olopa" – 4:27
"Iya Mi" – 5:06  
"Don't Ask Me" – 3:45
"Mo Bo Lowo Won" – 5:04
"Ika O Da" – 4:48
"Na Lie" – 3:51

References

2006 albums
D'banj albums
Albums produced by Don Jazzy
Yoruba-language albums